In December 1987, following substantial losses, the private, British independent airline British Caledonian (BCal) was taken over by newly privatised British Airways (BA).

The prime causes for the failure of the "Second Force" concept and BCal's demise were:
 The unwieldy route structure it had inherited from British United Airways (BUA).
 The Government's reluctance to live up to the spirit of the "Second Force" aviation policy through concrete deeds.
 The Government's conflict of interest as the sole owner of British Airways as well as the regulator for all British airlines.
 The 1976 "spheres of influence" policy that left both major British scheduled airlines with fragmented networks, thereby putting them at a competitive disadvantage vis-à-vis their main international rivals.
 The political consensus at the time that was hostile to the idea of wholly privately owned airlines providing scheduled services in competition with wholly or majority government-owned flag carriers, especially on the high-profile trunk routes.
 Highly restrictive bilateral air services agreements with little or no scope for dual designation.
 The cumbersome process to gain a licence to operate a scheduled service during the 1970s and early 1980s.
 The fact that on identical routes with the same fare structure load factors, revenues and yields are significantly lower at Gatwick than at Heathrow.
 Gatwick's location and its smaller catchment area compared with Heathrow.
 The Government's failure to fully accept the recommendations of the Civil Aviation Authority's 1984 airline competition White Paper that would have strengthened BCal's position at Gatwick by considerably increasing the scale and scope of its operation to enable it to withstand the competitive onslaught from a privatised BA.

The route structure BCal had inherited from BUA at the time of its inception was the result of unplanned and unsystematic growth since the early 1960s.

At the time, Sir Freddie Laker had begun building up BUA's scheduled route network in his capacity as that airline's managing director. In those days very limited opportunities existed for wholly privately owned, independent airlines to provide fully fledged scheduled air services on major domestic and international trunk routes. This resulted in a poor fit of many routes in BUA's network of scheduled services, thereby making it difficult to offer sensible connections that could be marketed to the travelling public. It also represented the best network structure Sir Freddie was able to put in place under the then prevailing regulatory regime.

The resulting network of domestic, European and intercontinental long-haul scheduled services from Gatwick was a motley collection of routes. This made it difficult to develop profitable streams of transfer traffic using Gatwick as a hub. Therefore, it was a challenge to persuade people to fly to Gatwick from relatively minor places like Genoa or Jersey in order to make an onward connection at the airport to secondary places in Africa or South America, and an even greater challenge to do this profitably.

At the height of its commercial success in the late 1970s and early 1980s, BCal focussed on those routes that carried a very high proportion of profitable, oil-related, premium business traffic. It even managed to become the preferred airline for high-ranking oil industry executives based in Texas, by providing convenient, hassle-free connections between Houston/Dallas, Lagos and Tripoli via the airline's Gatwick base. However, this initially successful strategy made the company dependent for most of its profits on a small number of markets whose fortunes were tied to the commodity price cycle, in unstable parts of the world, .

Although this worked in BCal's favour when the price of a barrel of crude oil was high during the late 1970s/early 1980s, it worked against it when the oil price collapsed in the mid-1980s. It also further compounded the firm's growing financial problems at the time, culminating in the financial crisis that led to its takeover by BA.

Despite BCal being awarded several licences to commence scheduled services on a number of high-profile long-haul routes with a good mix of business and leisure traffic, the Government made little or no attempt to assist the airline in obtaining reciprocal traffic rights from overseas governments that would have enabled it to use all of these licences.

For instance, the Civil Aviation Authority (CAA) had awarded BCal licences to launch fully fledged scheduled services from London Gatwick to New York's John F. Kennedy Airport (JFK), Los Angeles, Boston, Houston, Atlanta, Toronto and Singapore during the 1972 "Cannonball" hearings. However, it took the UK Government four years to negotiate a new air services agreement with the US government that actually enabled BCal to make use of its Houston and Atlanta licences. Renegotiation of the then very restrictive UK—Canadian air treaty that could have permitted BCal to operate a scheduled service to Toronto took even longer. British Overseas Airways Corporation's resistance to opening the lucrative Far Eastern route to Singapore to home-grown competition by another British scheduled airline was so strong that BCal eventually only managed to obtain a renewable, three-months exempt charter permit, which entitled the airline to operate a small number of seat-only charter flights between Gatwick, Bahrain and Singapore.

In addition, the UK Government itself began to undermine the "Second Force" concept from the moment it decided to re-allocate BCal's unused Gatwick—JFK and Gatwick—Los Angeles International licences to rival independent airline Laker Airways, following Sir Freddie's high-profile, public campaign to get his proposed Skytrain off the ground. The "Second Force" concept was furthermore undermined when the Government overturned the CAA's refusal to grant British Midland a licence to begin domestic scheduled services on the two main trunk routes between London and Scotland from Heathrow, without giving BCal reciprocal access to that airport. The "Second Force" policy was finally killed off when the Government decided to go ahead with BA's privatisation. Moreover, the CAA undermined the Government's "Second Force" policy as well by awarding Air Europe licences to launch scheduled services on several routes from Gatwick to Continental Europe in direct competition with existing BCal services. These measures significantly weakened BCal. They also had a detrimental effect on the airline's ability to establish itself as an effective competitor to the major scheduled airlines that were operating from Heathrow.

The conflict of interest that arose out of the UK Government's dual role as the sole owner of BA, at the time by far the largest British scheduled airline accounting for between three-quarters and four-fifths of the total output of Britain's entire scheduled air transport industry, as well as the regulator for all UK airlines meant that the interests of the "Second Force" were not always at the top of the Government's list of priorities. This conflict of interest put the Government in a dilemma when it was preparing BA for privatisation during the mid-1980s, knowing full well that this was likely to pose a major threat to BCal without substantial route transfers from the former to the latter, which would have enabled BCal to become big enough to compete with BA and other large scheduled airlines on a level playing field. At the same time, the Government was well aware that it risked undermining BA's successful flotation on the London Stock Exchange if it agreed to the transfer of several of BA's most lucrative long-haul routes to BCal, as well as the removal of all capacity restrictions on short-haul routes where both airlines were already competing with each other, as recommended by the CAA and requested by BCal itself.

The "spheres of influence" policy, which the Government had imposed on both of Britain's major scheduled carriers as a result of an aviation policy review conducted in the mid-1970s against a backdrop of huge losses the airline industry had faced in the aftermath of the early-'70s oil crisis and which had effectively eliminated long-haul competition between BA and BCal, had fragmented both airlines' networks. This had weakened them internationally in comparison with their main overseas rivals. The resulting weakening of BA's and BCal's international competitive strength was of far greater concern to the latter as it was much smaller than either BA or most of its foreign-based competitors and had a less comprehensive network offering fewer connections than most rival airlines.

At the time of BCal's inception, politicians on the left of the UK's political spectrum – in particular, Labour left wingers and most of the unions – opposed wholly private, independent airlines providing scheduled services in competition with the state-owned corporations. These critics' world view had been shaped by their World War II and early post-War experiences. They therefore regarded any form of competition as a waste of scarce resources. Some of them were also ideologically driven in their opposition to private enterprise playing a prominent role in the UK's air transport industry.

Restrictive bilateral air services agreements that had little or no scope for dual designation meant that BCal was effectively kept out of many markets for which it had already obtained licences from the CAA.

Even where the bilateral air services agreement between the UK and a foreign country enabled BCal to be designated as the second UK flag carrier, the airline was still facing numerous restrictions, in terms of the number of flights it could operate and/or the number of seats it could sell as well as the lowest fares it could offer. For example, the Anglo-French air treaty did not limit the number of airlines the UK Government could designate on the London—Paris route. However, it stipulated that all British airlines' combined share of the total capacity on that route could not exceed the combined capacity share of all French airlines, and that all capacity increases needed to be mutually agreed by both sides. As Air France was the only airline the French government had designated to serve this route, this effectively meant that BA and BCal were compelled to share between themselves the 50% of the total capacity between London and Paris that had been allocated to the UK. It also gave Air France an effective veto over any capacity increase, thereby allowing that airline to dictate the pace at which additional capacity could be added. It took BCal 15 years to attain a 20% share of the London—Paris market's total capacity since it commenced scheduled operations on that route.

BCal tried to work around these restrictions by using larger One-Eleven 500s in a low-density configuration featuring a first class section on week days and smaller, single-class One-Eleven 200s on week-ends. This enabled it to offer a higher frequency on week days, resulting in a more competitive schedule for business travellers while keeping within its allocated capacity share.

BCal faced similar capacity restrictions on the London—Amsterdam and London—Brussels routes, while other European governments refused requests from their UK counterpart to have BCal designated as a second UK flag carrier, arguing that there was no equivalent of a "Second Force" in their countries that could have matched the additional capacity BCal would have offered, that there simply were no spare capacities to do so, that this would violate the letter and spirit of the relevant bilateral air treaties/pool agreements, or that total British market share already exceeded that of the relevant overseas flag carriers when charter traffic was included as well.

BCal continued operating BUA's former regional routes from Gatwick to Le Touquet and Rotterdam for several years to provide additional capacity to/from alternative airports that were relatively close to the main airports where its operations were subject to capacity restrictions.

Some countries imposed capacity restrictions on BCal's operations even on regional routes that did not compete with any trunk routes and therefore could not have caused a diversion of traffic from these routes. BCal's London—Genoa route was a case in point. The only way the Italian authorities agreed to BCal's request to add an additional Saturday frequency on that route was to compel the airline to enter into a pool agreement with Alitalia. Under that agreement BCal was forced to share its revenues on that route with Italy's flag carrier, even after that airline had withdrawn its own Heathrow—Genoa service it had originally operated in competition with the Gatwick—Genoa service provided by BUA/BCal.

Such anti-competitive practices were not confined to BCal's European operations. The bilateral agreements governing most of BCal's long-haul routes obliged the airline to enter into a pool agreement with the designated foreign flag carrier[s]. These agreements stipulated that all revenues were to be equally shared by all carriers serving the same route. This usually meant that revenues were shared on a 50:50 basis, regardless of each carrier's actual market share. The only exceptions to this rule were the US as well as the Asian countries to which BCal flew. As far as the US was concerned, no US airline was allowed to enter into a pool agreement with any other airline – especially, a wholly/majority government-owned, foreign carrier – as this constituted a violation of that country's antitrust laws. With regard to the Asian countries that received scheduled services from BCal, the UK already had fully liberalised or fairly liberal bilateral air services agreements with these countries.

These bilateral restrictions seriously impeded BCal's efforts to successfully build a network of short-haul, European feeder services that was essential to provide sufficient transfer traffic for its long-haul routes from Gatwick. Furthermore, these restrictions made it difficult to offer its passengers a more frequent service on certain long-haul routes that could have attracted more high-yield business traffic. It also left the airline with an incomplete network, which resulted in a weak route structure. This, in turn, constituted a major competitive disadvantage.

As a general rule, a full-service scheduled operation at Gatwick with a fare structure that is identical to a similar operation at Heathrow produces a 10% lower load factor. For example, BCal's scheduled load factors at Gatwick rarely exceeded 60% whereas comparable BA load factors at Heathrow were usually above 70%. BCal tried to compensate for this difference in load factors between Gatwick and Heathrow by being a more cargo-oriented carrier than BA. Compared with BA, cargo accounted for a greater share of BCal's total revenues and profits.

Similarly, a scheduled service at Gatwick generates a 20% lower revenue and results in a 15% lower yield than a comparable service at Heathrow.

Heathrow's and Gatwick's respective geographic location as well as the number of people living within each airport's catchment area accounts for this difference in load factors, revenues and yields.

The former has a bigger catchment area than the latter because more people live north of the Thames than south of it. Heathrow's catchment area includes about three-quarters of London's population and roughly two-thirds of the population in Southeast England. London is where most of the demand for air travel in the South East originates. In addition, for most Londoners, Gatwick was a far less accessible airport than Heathrow in the days prior to the M25, as a result of its greater distance from most parts of London. In those days it took almost two hours to drive there from central London despite the low level of vehicular traffic. The only advantage Gatwick enjoyed over Heathrow in terms of ease and speed of access was its direct rail link to London Victoria.

The size of an airport's catchment area and its accessibility are of particular significance for the premium travel market. Back then, Heathrow's relative ease of access meant that it could attract a far greater number of travellers who were living or working in London than Gatwick. Moreover, Heathrow's larger catchment area meant that it was able to offer more frequent flights to a greater number of destinations with more conveniently timed connections. This, in turn, helped attract a greater number of business travellers who were the airlines' most profitable customers. It also meant that there were at least four to five business travellers in Heathrow's catchment area for every business traveller in Gatwick's catchment area.

This constituted a major competitive disadvantage BCal faced at Gatwick compared with other airlines that were based at Heathrow. It was further compounded by the fact that Gatwick had few connecting flights during the 1970s and early 1980s, as a result of the regulatory regime as well as the bilateral air services agreements the UK Government had negotiated with its overseas counterparts. (The former necessitated going through a costly and time-consuming process to gain a licence to operate a scheduled service. This involved lengthy hearings the CAA conducted for each route application where BA and other independent airlines, which felt the Government's policy of making BCal its "chosen instrument" of the private sector discriminated against them, objected to BCal's application and – in cases where there were several rival applications – against each other as well. The latter often had no scope for designating a second British scheduled airline in addition to the incumbent carrier. This meant that even in those cases where BCal had succeeded in securing licences to operate scheduled services on routes of its choice, it was prevented from using these licences if it involved an international service where there was no scope in the relevant bilateral agreement for the UK Government to designate it as the second UK flag carrier.) At the same time, Heathrow was the most important point in the world for interline traffic with more passengers changing flights there than at any other airport.

Whatever connections there were at Gatwick were mostly provided by BCal itself, at great cost to the airline. Since the early-1970s oil crisis, only the four short-haul BCal routes from Gatwick to Paris, Brussels, Jersey and Genoa had made a positive contribution, with Paris, Jersey and Genoa being the only routes that were genuinely profitable in their own right. However, given the fact that 40% of the airline's scheduled passengers were changing from one of its flights to another at Gatwick, BCal's dependency on providing this limited number of feeder services was such that withdrawing any of these services or significantly reducing frequencies – even those of loss-making services – had an immediate, negative impact on the loads of the profitable long-haul services and, therefore, on the company's overall profitability as well. It was with this in mind that BCal's senior management had always justified keeping its UK mainland domestic trunk routes despite these losing £2 million each year ever since BA had introduced its high-frequency Shuttle service on these routes from Heathrow. This had led to a reduction in frequency of the competing BCal services from Gatwick as the airport's smaller catchment area did not allow BCal to generate the minimum traffic flows that would have made a competing, high-frequency service from Gatwick viable. BCal's senior management estimated that its short-haul domestic feeder flights generated additional yearly long-haul revenues of £5 million and that the European feeder services added £20 million to the company's long-haul revenues.

The Government's decision to permit a limited transfer of routes from BA to BCal, rather than the major route transfer as well as the removal of capacity restrictions on all short-haul feeder routes proposed by BCal itself and advocated by the CAA's review of airline competition policy ahead of BA's privatisation, did not make BCal big enough in terms of economies of scale and scope to develop an efficient hub-and-spoke operation at Gatwick. This would have enabled BCal to compete with a much bigger, privatised BA as well as the giant US carriers on a level playing field. Instead, the limited route transfer still left BCal in an operationally and financially much weaker position than its far bigger and stronger rivals. This increased the airline's vulnerability to external shocks, thereby seriously undermining its financial strength to withstand such crises.

Notes and Citations
Notes

Citations

British Caledonian
British Caledonian